Fung Chuen Keung (馮傳強; 16 May 1944 – 18 March 2007), known as Jim Fung, was a practitioner and teacher of Wing Chun kung fu and founder of the 'International Wing Chun Academy'. He had been training under his master, Tsui Seung Tin (徐尚田), since 1960.

Accomplishments 

Jim Fung immigrated to Australia from Hong Kong in his late teens and studied accountancy and law at the University of Adelaide, graduating with a bachelor's degree in accounting. He is the author of two books, Wing Chun Kung Fu and Wing Chun Weapons, and produced a teaching video titled "Wing Chun", in 1985.

Fung was chosen to represent Chinese kung fu at the International Grandmasters' Martial Arts Exhibition in Adelaide, Australia, in 1989. However, he says the greatest honour thus far was having his Academy officially recognised by the Chinese Government and world ruling body for Chinese martial arts in the All China Martial Arts Register published in 1998.

In 1999, Fung was conferred the title of Grandmaster by Chu Shong Tin.

Death 
Fung had cancer and died in Sydney on 18 March 2007.

See also 
 Ip Man

References

Notes

Sources

External links 
International Wing Chun Academy
School: Tsui Seung Tin
Video containing footage of Jim Fung and Tsui Seung Tin

Wing Chun practitioners from Hong Kong
Deaths from esophageal cancer
Deaths from cancer in New South Wales
1944 births
2007 deaths
Hong Kong emigrants to Australia
Australian Wing Chun practitioners